Josiah Henson (June 15, 1789 – May 5, 1883) was an author, abolitionist, and minister. Born into slavery, in Port Tobacco, Charles County, Maryland, he escaped to Upper Canada (now Ontario) in 1830, and founded a settlement and laborer's school for other fugitive slaves at Dawn, near Dresden, in Kent County, Upper Canada, of Ontario. Henson's autobiography, The Life of Josiah Henson, Formerly a Slave, Now an Inhabitant of Canada, as Narrated by Himself (1849), is believed to have inspired the title character of Harriet Beecher Stowe's 1852 novel Uncle Tom's Cabin (1852). Following the success of Stowe's novel, Henson issued an expanded version of his memoir in 1858, Truth Stranger Than Fiction. Father Henson's Story of His Own Life (published Boston: John P. Jewett & Company, 1858). Interest in his life continued, and nearly two decades later, his life story was updated and published as Uncle Tom's Story of His Life: An Autobiography of the Rev. Josiah Henson (1876).

Early life

Josiah Henson was born on a farm near Port Tobacco, Charles County, Maryland, on a plantation owned by Francis Newman, where Henson experienced slave atrocities. Henson's father was enslaved by Francis Newman whereas Josiah Henson, his mother, and his siblings were enslaved by Dr. Josiah McPherson. When he was a boy, his father was punished for standing up to a slave overseer, for which he received one hundred lashes.  In addition, his right ear was nailed to the whipping post and then cut off.  His father was sold away to Alabama. Josiah Henson experienced hardships and sufferings at the hands of his masters as well, including having his arms broken and an injury to his back. Following his family's master's death, young Josiah was separated from his mother, brothers, and sisters. At the slave auction, Henson's siblings were sold first. His mother was bought by Issac Riley of Montgomery County and when she pleaded to her new owner to purchase Josiah Henson, Riley responded by hitting and kicking her. Josiah Henson was sold to Adam Robb of Rockville, Montgomery County. Adam Robb encountered Issac Riley and struck a deal which resulted in Henson being sold to Riley and reunited with his mother. Josiah Henson became very ill.  His mother pleaded with her owner, Isaac Riley, and Riley agreed to buy back Henson so she could at least have her youngest child with her, on the condition that he would work in the fields. 

Riley would not regret his decision, for Henson rose in his owners' esteem, and was eventually entrusted as the supervisor of his master's farm, located in Montgomery County, Maryland (in what is now North Bethesda). In 1825, Mr. Riley fell onto economic hardship and was sued by a brother-in-law. Desperate, he begged Henson, with tears in his eyes, to promise to help him. Duty bound, Henson agreed. Mr. Riley then told him that he needed to take his eighteen slaves to his brother in Kentucky by foot. They arrived in Daviess County, Kentucky, in the middle of April 1825 at the plantation of Mr. Amos Riley. In September 1828, Henson returned to Maryland in an attempt to buy his freedom from Issac Riley. He tried to buy his freedom by giving his master $350, which he had saved up, and a note promising a further $100. Originally, Henson only needed to pay the extra $100 by note. Mr. Riley, however, added an extra zero to the paper and changed the fee to $1000. Cheated of his money, Henson returned to Kentucky and then escaped to Kent County, Upper Canada, in 1830, after learning that he might be sold again. In the last of these attempts to attain freedom, Amos Riley agreed to give Josiah his freedom in exchange for $300. Josiah raised the money only to find that his master had raised the fee. Soon after, Henson learned that Riley planned to sell him in New Orleans, Louisiana, separating him from his wife and four children. When he found this out, Henson became determined to escape to Canada and freedom. He took his family with him, including his wife and their children to start the new life northward.

Escape from slavery 
After convincing his wife to escape with him, Henson's wife created a knapsack large enough to carry both of their smallest children; the eldest two would accompany his wife. The Henson family left Kentucky, traveling through the night, and sleeping in the woods throughout the day. They crossed into Indiana, then into Cincinnati,  where they were safely welcomed in a home for a few days. As the Henson family was crossing Hull's Road in Ohio, Josiah's wife fainted from exhaustion. As they continued on, they encountered Indians, and were reinvigorated with food and rest. After crossing a lake in Ohio, Josiah encountered Captain Burnham, a ship captain, who agreed to transport the Henson family to Buffalo, New York; from there they would cross the river into Canada. Upon setting foot into Canada, Josiah Henson described the ecstatic feelings of liberation by throwing himself onto the ground and rejoicing with his family. On October 28, 1830, Josiah Henson became a liberated man.

Slavery policy in Canada
Upper Canada had become a refuge for slaves who had escaped from the United States after 1793, when Lieutenant-Governor John Graves Simcoe passed "An Act to prevent the further introduction of Slaves, and limit the Term of Contracts for Servitude within this Province". The legislation did not immediately end slavery in the colony, but it did prevent the importation of slaves. As a result, any U.S. slave who set foot in what would eventually become Ontario, was free.

Later life
Josiah Henson first worked on farms near Fort Erie, then Waterloo Ontario, moving with friends to Colchester in 1834 to set up a Black settlement on rented land.  After earning enough, Henson was able to send his eldest son Tom to school, who in turn taught Josiah how to read. Henson became literate and was able to lead the growing community of fugitive slaves in Canada. Through contacts and financial assistance there, he was able to purchase  in Dawn Township, in neighbouring Kent County, to realize his vision of a self-sufficient community. The Dawn Settlement eventually reached a population of 500 at its height, exporting black walnut lumber to the United States and Britain. Henson purchased an additional  next to the Settlement, where his family lived. Henson also became an active Methodist preacher and spoke as an abolitionist on routes between Tennessee and Ontario. He also served in the Canadian Militia as a military officer, having led a Black militia unit in the Canadian Rebellion of 1837. In 1838, Henson and the militia successfully captured the rebel ship Anne, cutting off their supply lines to southwestern Upper Canada. Though many residents of the Dawn Settlement returned to the United States after slavery was abolished there, Henson and his wife continued to live in Dawn for the rest of their lives. Henson became the spiritual leader within the community and embarked on several trips to the United States and Great Britain where he met with Queen Victoria. While in Britain, Josiah publicly spoke to audiences and raised funds for the community back in Canada. Henson conducted several trips back to Kentucky to guide other slaves to freedom.

In 1878, Rev. Henson was described as "a jovial old man", who "considering his age is pretty active".

Henson was a Freemason.

Works
 The Life of Josiah Henson, Formerly a Slave, Now an Inhabitant of Canada, as Narrated by Himself. 1849
 Truth Stranger Than Fiction. Father Henson's Story of His Own Life. 1858
 Uncle Tom's Story of His Life: An Autobiography of the Rev. Josiah Henson. 1876

Miscellaneous
Josiah Henson is the first black man to be featured on a Canadian stamp. He was also recognized by the Historic Sites and Monuments Board of Canada in 1999 as a National Historic Person. A federal plaque to him is located in the Henson family cemetery, next to Uncle Tom's Cabin Historic Site.

A 2018 documentary titled Redeeming Uncle Tom: The Josiah Henson Story  covers his life.

Historic sites

Josiah Henson Museum & Park—North Bethesda, Maryland

The actual cabin in which Henson and other slaves were housed no longer exists; it was demolished along with other outbuildings in the 1950s when much of the former Riley plantation was developed into suburban tract housing.  The Riley family house, however, remains and is currently in a residential development in Rockville, Montgomery County, Maryland. After remaining in the hands of private owners for nearly two centuries, on January 6, 2006, the Montgomery Planning Board agreed to purchase the property and the acre of land on which it stands for $1,000,000. The house was opened to the public for one weekend in 2006. In March of 2009, the site received an additional $50,000 from the Maryland state Board of Public Works for the planning and design phase of a multiyear restoration project. An additional $100,000 may come from the Federal government that would go towards restoration and planning. The site was planned to be opened permanently to the public in 2012, until then offering guided tours four times a year.

As of 2018, the Josiah Henson Museum & Park, in North Bethesda, Maryland, contains the Riley/Bolton house, where Henson's owner lived. The Montgomery County park site (construction/restoration) reopened to the public on April 23, 2021, after the completion of the renovations and installation of new exhibits and building of the visitor center. "Ongoing archaeological excavations seek to find where Josiah Henson may have lived on the site."

The Josiah Henson Museum of African-Canadian History
Located near Dresden, Ontario, in Canada, the Josiah Henson Museum of African-Canadian History formally called Uncle Tom's Cabin Historic Site includes the cabin that was home to Josiah Henson during much of his time in the area, from 1841 until his death in 1883. The  includes Henson's cabin, an interpretive centre about Henson and the Dawn settlement, an exhibit gallery about the Underground Railroad, outbuildings, a 19th-century historic house, a cemetery and a gift shop.

See also
List of enslaved people

References

External links

 
Uncle Tom's Story of His Life. An Autobiography of the Rev. Josiah Henson (Mrs. Harriet Beecher Stowe's "Uncle Tom"). From 1789 to 1876. With a Preface by Mrs. Harriet Beecher Stowe, and an Introductory Note by George Sturge London: Christian Age Office, 1876.
The Life of Josiah Henson, Formerly a Slave, Now an Inhabitant of Canada, as Narrated by Himself. Boston: A. D. Phelps, 1849.
Truth Stranger Than Fiction. Father Henson's Story of His Own Life. Boston: John P. Jewett, 1858.
Biography at the Dictionary of Canadian Biography Online
Josiah Henson commemorative stamp
Digital History: Josiah Henson
Josiah Henson

National Historic Person plaque, and cemetery photo near Dresden, Ontario
 Henson, Josiah (1789-1883).The life of Josiah Henson, formerly a slave. London: Charles Gilpin; Edinburgh: Adam and Charles Black; Dublin: James Bernard Gilpin, 1852. This freely downloadable PDF was accessed February 15, 2014.
The Life of Josiah Henson From the Collections at the Library of Congress

1789 births
1883 deaths
People from Port Tobacco Village, Maryland
American Freemasons
American Prince Hall Freemasons
African-American abolitionists
Canadian Freemasons
19th-century American slaves
Uncle Tom's Cabin
Slave cabins and quarters in the United States
Black Canadian writers
Canadian autobiographers
Canadian Militia officers
Methodist ministers
Persons of National Historic Significance (Canada)
People from Chatham-Kent
Pre-Confederation Ontario people
American emigrants to pre-Confederation Ontario
Canadian people of African-American descent
Upper Canada Rebellion people
Writers from Maryland
Writers from Ontario
Methodist abolitionists
18th-century American slaves
People who wrote slave narratives
Fugitive American slaves that reached Canada